The Medal for internal security is a French civil and military medal established by Decree No. 2012-424 of 28 March 2012.

Description
The Medal for internal security is awarded to by the Ministry of the Interior without regard to rank or position and is typically awarded on 1 January and 14 July. However, award may be made at other times for exceptional circumstances. Approved missions may have taken place in France or abroad. Nominations for award of the medal are reviewed by a committee of eight members representing the Minister of the Interior, General Directorate of Local Authorities, General Directorate of National Police, General Directorate of National Gendarmerie, General Directorate for Internal Security, General Directorate of Civil Security and Crisis Management, and the General Secretariat of Immigration and Integration.

The following individuals are eligible for the medal:
Personnel under the Ministry of the Interior
Civilian and military personnel, professional or voluntary, placed under the authority of the Ministry of the Interior
The Municipal Police officers
Volunteers working in associations for homeland security missions
Any person, French or foreign, who has distinguished himself or herself by an action relating to internal security.

Clasps

Appearance

References

Internal secuurity
Internal secuurity
Law enforcement awards and honors
Awards established in 2012
2012 establishments in France